Steven Colin Osborne (born 3 March 1969) is an English former professional footballer who played as a striker in the Football League for Peterborough United and York City, and in non-League football for South Bank and Chester-le-Street Town.

References

1969 births
Living people
Footballers from Middlesbrough
English footballers
Association football forwards
South Bank F.C. players
Peterborough United F.C. players
York City F.C. players
Chester-le-Street Town F.C. players
English Football League players